Nemani Kavuru (born April 8, 1928) is a former Fijian cricketer. Kavuru was a right-handed batsman who bowled right-arm medium pace.

Kavuru made his first-class debut for Fiji in 1954 against Wellington during Fiji's 1953/54 tour of New Zealand. During the tour he a further first-class match against Auckland, which was his final first-class match for Fiji.

In his 2 first-class matches for Fiji he scored 41 runs at a batting average of 13.66, with a high score of 22. With the ball he took 3 wickets at a bowling average of 28.33, with best figures of 1/6. In the field Kavuru took a single catch.

Kavuru also represented Fiji in 10 non first-class matches in their 1953/54 tour of New Zealand, with his final match for Fiji coming against Bay of Plenty.

External links
Nemani Kavuru at Cricinfo
Nemani Kavuru at CricketArchive

1928 births
Living people
People from Tailevu Province
Fijian cricketers
I-Taukei Fijian people